Darren Boyko (born January 16, 1964) is a Canadian former professional ice hockey player. Boyko is best known for a one-game stint in the NHL and the Elitserien. He played one game in the NHL for the Winnipeg Jets in 1989 and one game in Elitserien for Västra Frölunda HC in 1997. 

Boyko was born in Winnipeg, Manitoba. As a youth, he played in the 1977 Quebec International Pee-Wee Hockey Tournament with a minor ice hockey team from Saint Boniface, Winnipeg.

Boyko spent two highly productive years playing for the University of Toronto before turning pro. In his first year with U of T, with Mike Keenan as his coach, Boyko put up 33-goals and 84 points in just 40 games then added another 17 points in just nine playoff games en route to a National Championship.  The following year he again scored 84 points for the Varsity Blues.

In '85-'86 he played four games for the Canadian National Team but spent the bulk of the year playing professionally in Finland. After three years with Helsinki, Boyko signed a deal with his hometown Winnipeg Jets.

Boyko had structured his deal to allow him to return to Finland if he didn't crack the Jets roster. While he made the team out of camp, he remained on the sidelines as a healthy scratch for over a month before finally drawing into a game versus the Boston Bruins. After his one-game audition, he returned to Finland and played seven more seasons with HIFK Helsinki.  

In 2001, Boyko was inducted into the Manitoba Sports Hall of Fame. In 2006, he became the second non-Finnish player, after Carl Brewer, to be inducted into the Finnish Hockey Hall of Fame.

Career statistics

Regular season and playoffs

Awards and achievements
MJHL First All-Star Team (1981)
MJHL Scoring Champion (1981)
Honoured Member of the Manitoba Hockey Hall of Fame
Member #180 of the Finnish Hockey Hall of Fame

See also
List of players who played only one game in the NHL

References

External links

1964 births
Living people
Berlin Capitals players
Canadian expatriate ice hockey players in Sweden
Canadian ice hockey centres
Canadian people of Ukrainian descent
Frölunda HC players
HIFK (ice hockey) players
Moncton Hawks players
Ice hockey people from Winnipeg
St. Boniface Saints (ice hockey) players
Toronto Varsity Blues ice hockey players
Undrafted National Hockey League players
Winnipeg Jets (1979–1996) players
Winnipeg Warriors (1980–1984) players